Antiviral proteins are proteins that are induced by human or animal cells to interfere with viral replication. These proteins are isolated to inhibit the virus from replicating in a host's cells and stop it from spreading to other cells. The Pokeweed antiviral protein and the Zinc-Finger antiviral protein are two major antiviral proteins that have undergone several tests for viruses, including HIV and influenza.

Pokeweed antiviral protein 

Pokeweed antiviral protein (PAP) is a ribosome inactivating protein that provides
pokeweed plants protection against both viral and fungal infections.  It also protects other types of plants that have genetically engineered to express RAP that do not normally do so.  Recombinant PAP has also been proposed as a treatment of human diseases such as AIDS and cancer.

ZC3HAV1 
ZAP (Zinc finger Antiviral Protein) is encoded by the ZC3HAV1 gene whose expression is induced by interferon and helps fight a number of viral infections including influenza.

IFITM3 

Interferon-induced transmembrane protein 3 (IFITM3) inhibits the replication of number of enveloped RNA viruses including influenza A, HIV and the Ebola and Dengue viruses. Consequently pharmacological induction of IFITM3 potentially could be used to treat a number of viral infections.

Protein kinase R 

Protein kinase R is interferon stimulated and activated either by double-stranded RNA (occurring as an intermediate in RNA viruses replication) or by other proteins. It is able to phosphorylate the eukaryotic translation initiation factor eIF2α thus inhibiting further cellular mRNA translation.

References 

Proteins by function
Antiviral drugs